Ray Mancini (born Raymond Michael Mancino; March 4, 1961), best known as "Boom Boom" Mancini, is an American former professional boxer who competed professionally from 1979 to 1992 and who has since worked as an actor and sports commentator. He held the WBA lightweight title from 1982 to 1984. Mancini inherited his nickname from his father, boxer Lenny Mancini. In 2015, Ray was inducted into the International Boxing Hall of Fame.

Early life and amateur career
Mancini, an American of Italian descent, was born Raymond Michael Mancino in Youngstown, Ohio on March 4, 1961. Boxing played a prominent role in the Mancini family history. Mancini's father, Lenny Mancini (the original "Boom Boom"), was a top-ranked contender during the 1940s. Lenny Mancini's dream, however, was dashed when he was wounded during World War II. Although Lenny Mancini returned to boxing, limitations resulting from his injuries prevented him from fulfilling his potential. He was a childhood friend and neighbor to future Oklahoma Sooners football head coach Bob Stoops.

Lenny inspired Ray to develop his boxing skills and encouraged him to train at a gym when he was quite young.  Thus, Ray then began his quest to win the world title for his father.

Professional career
On October 18, 1979, Mancini made his professional debut and defeated Phil Bowen with a first-round knockout. His whirlwind punching style caught the attention of network executives at several American television networks, and he became a regular on their sports programming. During this time Mancini defeated some notable boxers including former US champion Norman Goins in March 1981.

Lightweight title challenges
On April 30, 1980, Mancini defeated Bobby Sparks with a knockout at 1:28 in the first round for the regional Ohio State Lightweight title. Over a year later on May 16, 1981, Mancini won his first major title by defeating Jorge Morales for the WBC-affiliated NABF Lightweight championship when the referee determined that Morales could not continue after the 9th round.  In the post-match interview, Ray said that he was "keeping this title for myself because the world title is going to my dad".  Two months later, he successfully defended the title against José Luis Ramírez after a unanimous decision. Mancini's first attempt at a world title came on October 3 when he was pitted against Alexis Argüello for his World Boxing Council lightweight title. The event was selected by many (including The Ring and ESPN) as one of the most spectacular fights of the 1980s. Mancini gave Argüello trouble early and built a lead on the scorecards, but Argüello used his experience to his advantage in the later rounds and stopped Mancini in the 14th round.

Mancini would rebound from the loss to Argüello by winning his next two bouts, including a second successful defense of his NABF Lightweight title against Julio Valdez (10th-round TKO) which would earn him another chance at a world title.

WBA Lightweight champion
On May 8, 1982, in a match held at The Aladdin in Las Vegas, he challenged the new World Boxing Association lightweight champion, Arturo Frias. Fifteen seconds into the fight, Frias caught Mancini with a left hook to the chin and another combination made Mancini bleed from his eyebrow. Mancini recovered and dropped Frias right in the center of the ring with a combination. Dazed, Frias got back up, but Mancini immediately went on the offensive and trapped Frias against the ropes. After many unanswered blows, referee Richard Greene stopped the fight at 2:54 in the first round, and the Mancini family finally had a world champion.

Match against Duk Koo Kim

Mancini's first title defense, against former world champion Ernesto España, went smoothly with a Mancini knockout win in the 6th round.

On November 13, 1982, a 21-year-old Mancini met 27-year-old South Korean challenger Duk Koo Kim. Kim had struggled to make the  weight limit, and had to lose several pounds shortly before the fight. The title bout, at Caesars Palace in Las Vegas, was televised live on CBS Sports. Mancini won by TKO in the 14th round. Moments after the fight ended, Kim collapsed and fell into a coma, having suffered a subdural hematoma, and died four days later. The week after his death, the cover of Sports Illustrated magazine showed Mancini and Kim battling, under the title "Tragedy in the Ring".

Mancini went to the funeral in South Korea and fell into a deep depression afterwards. He has said that the hardest moments came when people approached him and asked if he was the boxer who "killed" Duk Koo Kim. Mancini went through a period of reflection, as he blamed himself for Kim's death. In addition, Kim's mother died by suicide three months after the fight, and the bout's referee, Richard Green, killed himself in July 1983.

As a result of Kim's death, the WBC took steps to shorten its title bouts to a maximum of 12 rounds. The WBA and WBO followed in 1988, and the IBF in 1989.

Later matches
Mancini began the process of getting his life back together by once again putting on boxing gloves. He went to Italy to face British champion George Feeney, where he won a 10-round decision.

He defended his title two more times. First, on September 15, 1983, he beat Peruvian challenger Orlando Romero by a knockout in nine rounds at Madison Square Garden to achieve a lifelong dream of fighting in that building, and then after a November 25 tune-up bout in which he defeated Johnny Torres by first-round knockout in his return to the Caesar's Palace hotel in Las Vegas, in January 1984, in a bout with former world champion Bobby Chacon, which was broadcast on HBO, Mancini defeated Chacon when referee Richard Steele stopped the fight in the third round with blood dripping from Chacon's left eye at Reno, Nevada.

In June 1984, Mancini, still recovering from the emotional trauma of Kim's death, fought Livingstone Bramble to defend his title in Buffalo, New York. This time however, Mancini came out on the losing end, defeated after 14 rounds. Mancini lost the title, but not before a fierce effort that resulted in an overnight stay at Millard Fillmore Hospital and 71 stitches around one eye.

Mancini returned to the ring twice to attempt to regain his world title. In a rematch with Bramble, Mancini lost the fight by one point on all three judges' scorecards in a 15-round decision. His next attempt came in March 1989, when he lost to Héctor 'Macho' Camacho in a split decision, Mancini had one final fight in April 1992, against former lightweight champion Greg Haugen. Mancini lost when referee Mills Lane stopped the fight in the seventh round.

Retirement and later work
A made-for-television movie based on Mancini's life aired in the 1980s. The former champion was able to keep 75 percent of his $12 million in purse money, which enabled him to pursue a broad range of interests in retirement.

Mancini, who as of 2007 resided in Los Angeles, owns the El Campeon Cigar Company and operates two movie production companies. Mancini appeared in and produced a handful of films. He appeared in the quirky 1994 comedy The Search for One-eye Jimmy, in David Mamet's MMA film Redbelt, and in the 2000 remake Body and Soul. Mancini played Charlie, Frank's retired father, in Bad Frank (2017).

Mancini produced Youngstown: Still Standing in 2010, which premiered at the 34th Cleveland International Film Festival on March 24. The documentary film featured his hometown friend, actor Ed O'Neill, and also included Jim Cummings, Kelly Pavlik, Jay Williams, Andrea Wood, and Mancini himself, among many other Youngstown natives and locals. John Chechitelli – another Youngstown native – directed and edited the 89-minute-long film. It recounts the history of Youngstown, Ohio, from its founding in 1797 to the present.

Mancini has a son also named Ray who appeared in the YouTube reality series SummerBreak, in which Manicini also had a guest role.

Mancini practices Brazilian Jiu-Jitsu and holds a purple belt in the martial art. And he became a fight analyst for the Fox reality series Celebrity Boxing.

In popular culture
Warren Zevon included a biographical song about Mancini called "Boom Boom Mancini" on his 1987 album Sentimental Hygiene.
Sun Kil Moon's 2003 album Ghosts of the Great Highway includes the track "Duk Koo Kim" which references the fight between Mancini and Kim.
In 2013, a documentary about Mancini was released called The Good Son: The Life of Ray Boom Boom Mancini.
In 2015, Mancini spoke to Retro Report about the repercussions of his fight with Duk Koo Kim, "Blood and Sport".

Professional boxing record

References

External links

Mancini vs. Kim 30-year anniversary at The New York Times

1961 births
Boxing commentators
American people of Italian descent
Living people
Boxers from Youngstown, Ohio
World Boxing Association champions
American practitioners of Brazilian jiu-jitsu
American male boxers
World lightweight boxing champions
Light-welterweight boxers
American male actors
International Boxing Hall of Fame inductees